Randolph Algernon Ronald Stewart, 12th Earl of Galloway (21 November 1892 – 13 June 1978) was the son of Randolph Stewart, 11th Earl of Galloway, styled Viscount Garlies from 1901 to 1920.

Early life
His father, the second son of the 9th Earl of Galloway, inherited the earldom upon the death of his uncle, Alan Stewart, 10th Earl of Galloway, in 1901.

He was educated at Harrow School, followed by the Royal Military College, Sandhurst, from where he graduated and was commissioned into the Scots Guards. He served with the regiment during World War I.

Career
Upon the outbreak of World War II, he served as the first Commanding Officer of the 7th Battalion, King's Own Scottish Borderers.

Personal life
On 14 October 1924, he married American heiress Philippa Fendall Wendell at St Margaret's, Westminster. Philippa was the second daughter of Jacob Wendell III and Marian ( Fendall) Wendell, who had been living in England for several years. Marian was in turn the granddaughter of Philip Richard Fendall II, the District Attorney of the District of Columbia. Philippa was the sister of Anne Catherine Tredick Wendell, first wife of Henry Herbert, 6th Earl of Carnarvon. Randolph and Philippa had the following children:

 Lady Antonia Marian Amy Isabel Stewart (1925–2017), who married Mark Dalrymple, 3rd Baronet of New Hailes.
 Randolph Keith Reginald Stewart, 13th Earl of Galloway (1928–2020)

Lady Galloway died on 22 February 1974. Lord Galloway died on 13 June 1978 at which time he was succeeded in his titles by his son, Randolph. On his death, the earldom and other titles passed to Randolph's second cousin once removed, Andrew Clyde Stewart, a great-great-grandson of the 9th Earl.

References

External links

12
1892 births
1978 deaths
Stewart, Randolph, 12th Earl of Galloway
Lord-Lieutenants of Kirkcudbright
People educated at Harrow School
Scots Guards officers
British Army personnel of World War I
British Army personnel of World War II
Graduates of the Royal Military College, Sandhurst